Nirmala Chennappa or Nirmala Sathya is an Indian film director, actress, producer and technician in the Kannada film industry. She was participated as contestant in BIGG BOSS Kannada season 8.

Awards

Career
Nirmala Chennappa has been part of more than 3 movies and many soaps/serials in Kannada.

Television 
Nirmala was one of the contestants in the Bigg Boss Kannada (season 8) and got evicted on the 14th day of the show.

Selected filmography
 Kiragoorina Gayyaligalu (2016) (Dubbing artist)
 Jigarthanda (2016) (Actress)
 Thallana (2013) (Actress)

See also

List of people from Karnataka
Cinema of Karnataka
List of Indian film actresses
Cinema of India

References

External links

Filmography of Nirmala Sathya on chiloka.com

Actresses in Kannada cinema
Actresses in Tamil cinema
Living people
Kannada people
Actresses from Karnataka
Actresses from Bangalore
Indian film actresses
21st-century Indian actresses
Actresses in Kannada television
Year of birth missing (living people)